La Prude (The Prude) is a comic play by the French philosopher and author Voltaire, written in 1739. It is based on The Plain Dealer by William Wycherly, which in turn is based on Molière's The Misanthrope. It was performed once, in 1747, having been offered to the Comédie-Française but not accepted.

References

Further reading 
 Russell Goulbourne (2006) "Voltaire, Comic Dramatist" Studies of Voltaire and the Eighteenth Century

Works by Voltaire
1739 works
Comedy plays
French-language plays
Plays based on works by Molière